Cumbuco is a small fishing village situated about  North West from the city of Fortaleza, in the state of Ceara, along the north east coast of Brazil. The population is around 1600. The village is regarded as picturesque and scenic and is attracting both domestic and international tourism.  Cumbuco has a beach near Fortaleza on one side of town and sand dunes on the other side. There is a small and busy village centre built around the main square adjacent to the beach which has a fresh fish market, tropical palm trees, and several beach restaurants (barracas).

Facing onto the Atlantic Ocean, Cumbuco also has perfect conditions for kitesurfing and windsurfing, with mild air and ocean temperatures and strong and consistent South East trade winds from July to January. Sand dunes behind the village also create a thermal effect that boost the wind speed. 
Cumbuco is ideal destination for kite vacation for beginners and advanced kiteboarders. Beach is wide and sandy, Wind blows every day at season from side shore direction, many beach hotels, pousadas  and kite clubs.

There are more than 300 km of beaches in the State of Ceara, which are popular for practicing downwind trips and kite safaris.

References

External links

My-Cumbuco - A lot of information about Cumbuco
Cumbuco information
Portal Cumbuco
Cumbuco Kitesurf Guide

Populated places in Ceará